The Under Secretary of Agriculture for Trade and Foreign Agricultural Affairs is a position within the United States Department of Agriculture. The position was mandated after the passing of the 2014 Farm Bill and officially created in 2017. Ted McKinney served as the first under secretary from 2017 to 2021. The current officeholder is Alexis Taylor, who was sworn in on December 29, 2022.

References 

United States Department of Agriculture